Gostivar (Albanian and Turkish: Gostivar), is a city in North Macedonia, located in the upper Polog valley region. Gostivar has road and railway connections with the other cities in the region, such as Tetovo, Skopje, Kičevo, Ohrid, and Debar. Gostivar is the seat of Gostivar Municipality.

Etymology

The name Gostivar comes from the Slavic word gosti meaning "guests" and the Turkish word "dvar" meaning castle or fort.

Geography

Gostivar, at an elevation of 535 meters, is situated on the foothills of one of the Šar Mountains. Vardar River extends through Gostivar, cutting it in half, passes through the capital Skopje, goes through the country, enters Greece and finally reaches the Aegean Sea.

Demographics
According to the 2002 census, the city of Gostivar had a population of 35,847 inhabitants and the ethnic composition is the following:

Albanians, 16,890 (47.1%)
Macedonians, 11,885 (33.2%)
Turks, 4,559 (12.7%)
Romas, 1,899 (5.3%)
others, 614 (1.7%)

The most common mother tongues in the city were the following:

Albanian, 16,877 (47.1%)
Macedonian, 13,843 (38.6%)
Turkish, 4,423 (12.3%)
Romani, 301 (0.8%)
Serbian, 124 (0.3%)
others, 279 (0.7%)

The religious composition of the city was the following:

Muslims, 23,686 (66.1%)
Orthodox Christians, 11,865 (33.1%)
others, 296 (0.8%)

History 

It is known that there was a town called Draudacum, Draudàkon (Δραυδάκον in Ancient Greek), built in 170BC, near or on the current place of Gostivar.

Early mentions of the town was made by the Roman historian Livy. He records how during the Third Macedonian War the King of Macedon Perseus at the head of 10000 men, after taking Uskana (Kicevo), attacked Drau-Dak, today Gostivar.

Ottoman Period

In the late 14th century, Gostivar came under Ottoman rule along with the rest of Vardar Macedonia.

In the late 19th and early 20th century, Gostivar was part of the Kosovo Vilayet of the Ottoman Empire. During this period it became the centre of a kaza (municipality) and grew into one of the richer towns of Ottoman Vardar Macedonia.

Gostivar remained under Ottoman rule for more than 500 years until 1912, when it was occupied by Serbian troops during the First Balkan War.

Yugoslav Period

From 1929 to 1941, Gostivar was part of the Vardar Banovina of the Kingdom of Yugoslavia, and then became part of Italian-occupied Albania.

Economy 

Gostivar is a merchant city. From the second half of the 19th century, merchants started moving in and opening stores. There is also a market day, Tuesday. Merchants from Kruševo, Kičevo, Tetovo and Veles were the founders of the Gostivar merchant centre at that time. Today they have become electricians, mechanics workers, and Gostivar is a modern city.

There are 20,000 Expatriate citizens who are a key source of income in the municipality economy. It is calculated that each year between June and August, approximately 500,000 euros are brought into the city when they return.

In May 2015, an automotive company announced that it would open a new plant in Gostivar in the summer of 2015.

Tourism 
Gostivar is one of the biggest settlements in the Polog valley. The Polog valley can be observed from the high lands of Mavrovo and Galičnik.

Approximately  from Gostivar is a ski resort, "Zare Lazarevski", in the Mavrovo National Park. Mavrovo attracts tourists during all seasons, but is more popular in winter when it is all covered with snow. The tourist resort has 1200 beds and over 1000 villas, with hotels, restaurants and shops. The Mavrovo region hosts ski tournaments and other sport recreations.  The peaks on the northern part of the Bistra mountain: Rusino Brdo, Sultanica and Sandaktas, host winter sport activities.

The Šar Mountain is one of the most important Alpine mountain ranges in North Macedonia together with neighbouring Mount Korab and Bistra mountains.

Fauna of the area includes the Šarplaninac dog, which are used by the sheep-herders of Šar Mountain (Šar Planina in Serbian and Macedonian), to guide and protect their sheep herds.  Bears, wild boar and deer exist also.  The area has a variety of vegetation and wildlife, including medical herbs, and even hunt activities can be arranged.

Šar Mountain is among the largest compact area covered with pastures on the European Continent. This provides opportunities for animal husbandry. Dairy products, mainly cheese and feta cheese, are made in the many sheepfolds on Šar and the adjacent mountains.  These include several kinds of feta cheese, like Shara and Galicnik.

Located in the northwestern part of North Macedonia, Popova Shapka is another winter ski resort. Popova Shapka has hotel accommodation.

Visitors not from the Republic of North Macedonia, and elsewhere other countries, use the facilities. Popova Shapka has been a host to both the European and Balkan Ski Championships. Not far from the resort, there are a number of small glacial lakes around on the mountain. There are two ways to get to Popova Shapka: by car, and by rope-railway with a starting location in Tetovo.

Sports
Football club KF Gostivar has played in the Macedonian First League and stage their home games at the City Stadium Gostivar.

Sister cities
  Akhisar – Turkey
  Kőbánya – Hungary

Notable people

References

External links
 Official web site of the Municipality of Gostivar
 Gostivar FAQ
 Gostivar Online

Gallery

 
Cities in North Macedonia
Ski areas and resorts in North Macedonia